Beijing Fengtai railway station is a railway station located in the Fengtai District of Beijing. It was renamed from Fengtai railway station to Beijing Fengtai railway station in 2021. The new railway station opened on 20 June 2022.

The new railway station is served by both high-speed and conventional-speed railways, including Beijing–Guangzhou high-speed railway, Beijing–Guangzhou railway. The station is the largest is Asia, with departure lounges, restaurants and other amenities spread across 400,000 square meters. At its peak, the station will be able to host 14,000 passengers per hour on a mix of bullet and regular trains as well as subway lines.

History
Construction on the original station began in 1895, and it was opened in 1896. Passenger services ceased on 19 June 2010. The station has been closed since June 2010 in preparation for the construction of the new Fengtai railway station, which is expected to have a similar scale to Beijing South railway station.

A metro station on Line 10 of the Beijing Subway was opened here on 5 May 2013.

The construction of the new station was officially started in mid 2018 and the new railway station was expected to open in 2020 for conventional-speed railway, and in 2021 for high-speed railway. The opening of the new station was delayed until 20 June 2022 when it opened for both conventional-speed and high-speed railway.

Layout

China Railway 
The station has 12 platforms for high-speed trains (consisting of 6 islands) directly above 20 platforms for conventional services (consisting of 9 islands and 2 side platforms).

Beijing Subway 

Fengtai railway station is served by Line 10 and Line 16 of the Beijing Subway. Both the line 10 and line 16 stations have underground island platforms. The station has 3 exits, lettered C1, C2, and D. Exit C1 is accessible via an elevator.

References

Railway stations in Fengtai District
Beijing Subway stations in Fengtai District
Railway stations in China opened in 1896
Railway stations closed in 2010
2010 disestablishments in China
Stations on the Beijing–Shanghai Railway